The Prevention of Corruption Act 1906 (6 Edw.7 c.34) was an Act of the Parliament of the United Kingdom of Great Britain and Ireland (as it was then). It was the second of three pieces of legislation regarding corruption which after 1916 were collectively referred to as the Prevention of Corruption Acts 1889 to 1916. It was repealed by the Bribery Act 2010.

Section 1 made it an offence (formerly classified as a misdemeanour) subject to imprisonment up to 7 years:
 for an agent to obtain "any gift or consideration" as an inducement or reward for doing any act, or showing favour or disfavour to any person, in relation to his principal's affairs.
 for any person to give any gift or consideration to an agent to induce him to do an act in relation to his principal's affairs.  
 for any person or agent to knowingly falsify receipts, accounts or other documents with the intent to deceive the principal.

The 2017-19 prosecutions of Peter Chapman, and of Alstom and its company officers for conspiracy to corrupt in Lithuania may have been the last prosecutions for this offence.

Agent and principal

An "agent" includes any person employed by or acting for another, and a "principal" includes an employer.

The "principal" is the person the agent is employed by or acting for.

Anyone working for the government counts as an agent.

A prosecution in England and Wales for an offence under this Act could not be instituted without the consent of the Attorney-General, who could discontinue an investigation that was working towards a prosecution under the Act.

See also
Prevention of Corruption Act

References

External links
 
 List of amendments to this Act in the Republic of Ireland, from the Irish Statute Book.

United Kingdom Acts of Parliament 1906
Corruption in the United Kingdom